DSS may refer to:

Science and technology

Biology and medicine
 Dejerine Sottas syndrome, genetic disorder a.k.a. Charcot-Marie-Tooth disease, type 3
 Dengue shock syndrome
 Disease-specific survival
 Dextran, a chemical used experimentally to induce colitis in rodents
 Dioctyl sodium sulfosuccinate, a lubricant, laxative, and pesticide
 Dimethyl-silapentane-sulfonate, chemical compound used in spectroscopy for calibration
 Disuccinimidyl suberate, a biochemical tool used as protein cross-linking agent

Technology
 Deep Space Station, an antenna station in any of Deep Space Communication Complexes, part of the Deep Space Network.
 Digital Satellite Service, digital satellite television transmission system used by DirecTV
 Digitized Sky Survey, a digital version of several photographic atlases of the night sky
 Direct-Sequence Spreading, another term for direct-sequence spread spectrum
 Dynamic Spectrum Sharing, at technique for the coexistence of 4G and 5G mobile standards.

Computing
 Darwin Streaming Server, the open source equivalent of QuickTime Streaming Server
 Decision support system, information system that supports business or organizational decision-making activities
 Digital Signature Services, OASIS standard XML-based request/response protocols
 Digital Signature Standard, which uses the Digital Signature Algorithm
 Digital Speech Standard, a format of audio file
 Digital Subscriber System ISDN, signalling standards:
 Digital Subscriber System No. 1, a digital signalling protocol (D channel protocol) used for the ISDN
 Digital Subscriber System No. 2, as the successor to DSS1, is also a digital signalling protocol (D channel protocol) used for the B-ISDN

Government and politics

United States
 Defense Security Service, an agency in the U.S. Department of Defense
 Department of Social Services, another name for Child Protective Services, a government agency in several states
 Diplomatic Security Service, an agency in the U.S. Department of State
 Director of Selective Service of the Selective Service System, as in the widely used "Draft Card" in the U.S. during World War II, officially known as DSS Form 1 Registration Card
 Domestic Security Section, part of the Criminal Division of the U.S. Department of Justice

Elsewhere
 Directorate of State Security (Drejtoria e Sigurimit të Shtetit), Albanian domestic security agency during the Hoxha and Alia dictatorship (1944-1991); dissolved in 1991
 Department of Social Security (Australia), defunct governmental agency in Australia
 Department of Social Services (Australia), a national government department in Australia
 Department of Social Security (United Kingdom), defunct governmental agency in the United Kingdom
 Demokratska Srpska stranka (Democratic Serb Party), a political party in Montenegro
 Democratic Party of Serbia (Demokratska stranka Srbije), a political party in Serbia
 United Nations Department for Safety and Security, a department of the UN dealing with the security and safety of its staff
 Department of State Services, Nigeria, formerly known as State Security Service (SSS), the domestic intelligence agency of Nigeria

Schools and organizations
 Delta Secondary School (Delta, British Columbia), a school in Canada
 Direct Subsidy Scheme, a schooling system in Hong Kong
 Dansk Spejderkorps Sydslesvig, a Scout association of the Danish minority of Southern Schleswig, Germany
 Dera Sacha Sauda, a non-profit social welfare and spiritual organization

Other
 Dead Sea Scrolls, ancient manuscripts discovered in caves on the shore of the Dead Sea
 Blaise Diagne International Airport, Diass, Senegal, by IATA code
 Deputy Superintending Surveyor, an entry level engineering post in India
 Design for Six Sigma (also abbreviated DFSS), a business management method
 Dizionario Storico della Svizzera, the Historical Dictionary of Switzerland (Italian)
 Duplex Stainless Steel, a steel with improved resistance to localized corrosion
 Demographic surveillance system - Periodic data collection system of a geographic area

See also 
 DS2 (disambiguation)